Pavlovsky District is an administrative district (raion), one of the forty in Nizhny Novgorod Oblast, Russia. Municipally, it is incorporated as Pavlovsky Municipal District. It is located in the west of the oblast. Its administrative center is the town of Pavlovo. Population: 100,960 (2010 Census);  The population of Pavlovo accounts for 60.1% of the district's total population.

History
The district was established in 1929.

Notable residents 

Nikolai Albov (1866–1897), botanist and geographer, born in Pavlovo
Yelizaveta Yermolayeva (born 1930), Soviet runner

References

Notes

Sources

Districts of Nizhny Novgorod Oblast
 
States and territories established in 1929
